The Rumble is one of six teams currently competing in SlamBall.

History
The Los Angeles Rumble were one of two original Slamball teams, along with the Chicago Mob, formed in 2001. In their first season, they beat the Diablos (now the Hombres) 46–41 and won the first ever championship. The next season they made the playoffs again but lost to the Slashers, after which the league went on hiatus until 2008. When they returned, they finished with a 9–3 record and went to the championship to play the Slashers, whom they lost to, 48–46. The Rumble are the only team to have been in the playoffs every season.

Season-by-season

Personnel

Head coaches

Current roster

Slamball
Sports clubs established in 2002